Pappenheimer may refer to:

the regiment of cuirassiers led by Gottfried Heinrich Graf zu Pappenheim
the Pappenheimer rapier
a member of the noble house of Pappenheim, see Pappenheim (state)
an inhabitant or native of Pappenheim
Pappenheimer family

See also
Pappenheimer bodies, abnormal deposits of iron within red blood cells
Pappenheim (disambiguation)